H. Stephen Larsen is a psychologist and author who, with his wife Robin Larsen, was on the founding board of advisors of the Joseph Campbell Foundation, and also founded the Center for Symbolic Studies, to carry on with the work of Joseph Campbell.  He is best known for his work in mythology, and for being a pioneer in the field of neurofeedback.

Background
Larsen is a graduate of Columbia University, (B.A., M.A.), and Union Institute & University (Ph.D.).  He is professor emeritus of psychology with SUNY Ulster.  He has trained with Edward Whitmont, M.D., Jungian training analyst, and Stanislav Grof, M.D., as well as Joseph Campbell, M.A. LL.D., in the understanding of myth and symbol.  For the last 10 years, he has been working closely with Len Ochs, Ph.D., innovator/originator of the LENS neurofeedback technique, and researching its potential.  In 2003, they jointly presented "Fundamentals of the LENS Method: Using EEG Driven Stimulation to Work with the Clinical Spectrum of Problems: Special Emphasis on the Neurologically Sensitive Patient" at the ISNR Conference in Houston, and their work together is further documented in Larsen's book on LENS,  which is also featured on Ochs' website.

Bibliography

Larsen has written over forty other books, articles, and introductions.

 The Shaman's Doorway 
 The Mythic Imagination  and 
 A Fire in the Mind: The Life of Joseph Campbell with Robin Larsen. Rochester, Vermont: Inner Traditions, 2002 , 
 The Healing Power of Neurofeedback: The Revolutionary LENS Technique for Restoring Optimal Brain Function

See also
Jonathan Young
Credo Mutwa

References

External links
 The Center for Symbolic Studies
 The Stone Mountain Counseling Center (his practice and research facility)

21st-century American psychologists
Columbia University alumni
Living people
Year of birth missing (living people)